Kissing Students is sculpture and fountain in Raekoja plats, Tartu, Estonia. The structure locates in front of Town Hall Square. The structure is one of the most recognised symbols of Tartu.

The fountain was built in 1948 and it was used especially by newlyweds who sought to find luck for future when standing there.

The sculpture was created in 1998 by Mati Karmin.

References

Tartu
Outdoor sculptures
1998 sculptures
Estonian art
Fountains in Europe